{|

{{Infobox ship career
|Hide header=
|Ship country=United States
|Ship flag=
|Ship name=*USS Courtenay P (1917–1918)
USS SP-899 (1918)
|Ship namesake=*Courtenay P was her previous name retained
SP-899 was her section patrol number
|Ship owner=
|Ship operator=
|Ship registry=
|Ship route=
|Ship ordered=
|Ship awarded=
|Ship builder=Gas Engine and Power Company, Morris Heights, the Bronx, New York
|Ship original cost=
|Ship yard number=
|Ship way number=
|Ship laid down=
|Ship launched=
|Ship sponsor=
|Ship christened=
|Ship completed=ca. 1916
|Ship acquired=Ordered delivered 5 July 1917 
|Ship commissioned=30 August 1917
|Ship recommissioned=
|Ship decommissioned=
|Ship maiden voyage= 
|Ship in service=
|Ship out of service=
|Ship renamed=SP-899' in 1918
|Ship reclassified=
|Ship refit=
|Ship struck=
|Ship reinstated=
|Ship homeport=
|Ship identification=
|Ship motto=
|Ship nickname=
|Ship honours=
|Ship honors=
|Ship captured=
|Ship fate=Returned to owner 12 December 1918
|Ship notes=Operated as private motorboat Courtenay P 1916-1917 and from 1918
|Ship badge=
}}

|}

USS Courtenay P (SP-899) was a United States Navy patrol vessel in commission from 1917 to 1918.Courtenay P was built as a private motorboat of the same name in about 1916 by the Gas Engine and Power Company at Morris Heights in the Bronx, New York. On 5 July 1917, she was ordered delivered to the U.S. Navy for use as a section patrol boat during World War I. She was commissioned as USS Courtenay P (SP-899) on 30 August 1917. In 1918, her name was changed to USS SP-899.

On 6 July 1918, the Navy declared SP-899'' unfit for further service and ordered her returned to her owner. Accordingly, she was duly returned to her owner on 12 December 1918.

References

Department of the Navy Naval History and Heritage Command Online Library of Selected Images: Civilian Ships: Courtenay P (American Motor Boat, circa 1916). Served as USS Courtenay P (SP-899) and USS SP-899 in 1917-1918
NavSource Online: Section Patrol Craft Photo Archive SP-899 ex-Courtenay P. (SP 899)

Patrol vessels of the United States Navy
World War I patrol vessels of the United States
Ships built in Morris Heights, Bronx
1916 ships